Casper Ruud was the defending champion but retired in the first round facing Íñigo Cervantes.

Félix Auger-Aliassime won the title after defeating Cervantes 6–7(4–7), 6–3, 6–3 in the final.

Seeds

Draw

Finals

Top half

Bottom half

References
Main Draw
Qualifying Draw

Copa Sevilla - Singles
2017 Singles